A doodle is a relatively simple drawing made while a person's attention is otherwise occupied.

Doodle or Doodles may also refer to:

Arts, entertainment, and media
 Doodle, a virtual pet in the video game Toontown Online
 Doodles (comics), a children's activity panel/comic strip featuring Professor Doodles
 Doodles (Tweenies), a pet dog on the British children's programme Tweenies
  Doodles, the animated residents of Cool World, a 1992 Ralph Bakshi film
 "The Doodle" (Seinfeld), an episode of the TV series Seinfeld
 Doodles, a community-driven collectibles NFT project

People
 A.L. "Doodle" Owens (1930–1999), American country music songwriter and singer
 Doodles Weaver (1911–1983), American actor, comedian and musician

Animals
 Doodle (dog), a hybrid of a poodle and other dog breeds
 Doodles, the former mascot of Chick-fil-A, replaced in 1997

Other uses
 Doodle (website), a calendar tool for time management
 Google Doodle, a temporary alteration of the Google logo
 GlobalDoodle, a defunct website for collaborative real-time drawing

See also
 Doodler, unidentified serial killer
 Doodletown, New York, a ghost town in Bear Mountain State Park
 "Yankee Doodle", a song